Crime Classification Manual: A Standard System for Investigating and Classifying Violent Crimes (1992) is a text on the classification of violent crimes by John E. Douglas, Ann W. Burgess, Allen G. Burgess and Robert K. Ressler. The publication is a result of a project by the Federal Bureau of Investigation's National Center for the Analysis of Violent Crime.

A second edition of the book was published in 2006, and added 155 pages of new information and research.

See also
 FBI method of profiling
 Offender profiling
 Forensic psychology

References

External links
 Crime Classification Manual
 Crime Classification Manual

Criminology handbooks and manuals
Classification systems
Law enforcement techniques
Offender profiling
Criminal investigation
Forensic psychology
1992 non-fiction books